Richard Ireland may refer to:
 Richard Davies Ireland, Australian politician
 Richard Ireland (rower), British rower